Vahdatabad (also Romanized as Vaḩdatābād) is a village in Negar Rural District, in the Central District of Bardsir County, Kerman Province, Iran. A census in 2006 acknowledged its existence, but its population was not reported.

References 

Populated places in Bardsir County